Lucien Baudrier (13 December 1861 – 22 October 1930) was a sailor from France, who represented his country at the 1900 Summer Olympics in Meulan, France. Baudrier also took, as crew, the Bronze medal in the first race of the 1 to 2 ton and the 4th place in the second race of the 1 to 2 ton.

Further reading

References

French male sailors (sport)
Sailors at the 1900 Summer Olympics – 1 to 2 ton
Olympic sailors of France
1861 births
1930 deaths
Olympic bronze medalists for France
Olympic medalists in sailing
Medalists at the 1900 Summer Olympics